Barclay House, also known as the Joshua Hartshorne Estate, North Hill, and The Barclay, is a historic home located in West Chester, Chester County, Pennsylvania. The original section was built in 1866–67, and believed to have been designed by architect Addison Hutton (1834–1916).  It was a -story, brick dwelling in the Italianate style. It was expanded to three stories with the expansion of 1935–36.  Also added at that time was a three-story connecting block, three-story west block, and one-story north block. The house was also renovated in the Colonial Revival style.  The north block was expanded to two stories in 1998.  Also on the property is a contributing carriage house built in 1869.  It was converted to a residence in 1925. It was built as a single family residence, but converted to a Quaker boarding home for the elderly in 1935–1936.  The boarding home closed at this location in 1997.

It was listed on the National Register of Historic Places in 2002.

References

West Chester, Pennsylvania
Houses on the National Register of Historic Places in Pennsylvania
Italianate architecture in Pennsylvania
Colonial Revival architecture in Pennsylvania
Houses completed in 1867
Houses in Chester County, Pennsylvania
National Register of Historic Places in Chester County, Pennsylvania